Universidad de Las Palmas Club de Fútbol "B" were a Spanish football club, founded in 1998, located in Las Palmas de Gran Canaria. Due to the first team dissolution, the reserve team was forced to dissolve. They were the reserve team of Universidad de Las Palmas CF.

Season to season

6 seasons in Tercera División

External links 
  

Association football clubs established in 1998
Association football clubs disestablished in 2011
Universidad de Las Palmas CF
Defunct football clubs in the Canary Islands
1998 establishments in Spain
2011 disestablishments in Spain
University and college association football clubs in Spain